Sartaj Singh Chhatwal (born 26 May 1940) is an Indian politician, who served as PWD minister in government of Madhya Pradesh. He is a former member of the Lok Sabha of India in 2004. He represented the Narmadapuram constituency of Madhya Pradesh for four terms. Sartaj Singh was a long time BJP member and even served as a minister in MP state government but on 8 November 2018, he joined the rival Indian National Congress party over denial of assembly ticket to him.  He also served as Union Cabinet Minister, Health and Family Welfare from 16 May 1996 to 1 June 1996.

See also 
 Shivraj Singh Chouhan Third ministry (2013–)
 List of members of the Lok Sabha (1952–present)

References 

Living people
1940 births
Madhya Pradesh MLAs 2013–2018
Bharatiya Janata Party politicians from Madhya Pradesh
India MPs 2004–2009
Indian Sikhs
People from Narmadapuram district
State cabinet ministers of Madhya Pradesh
People from Ujjain
India MPs 1989–1991
India MPs 1991–1996
India MPs 1996–1997
India MPs 1998–1999
Lok Sabha members from Madhya Pradesh